Albert Sykes (29 September 1900 – 1994) was an English professional footballer who played in the Football League for Birmingham, Brighton & Hove Albion and Lincoln City.

Sykes was born in Shirebrook, Derbyshire. A coal miner by trade, he played football for Maltby Victoria and Maltby Main Colliery Welfare before turning professional with First Division club Birmingham in August 1924. He played only once for Birmingham's first team, standing in for George Liddell in a 3–2 defeat away to Burnley on 2 February 1925, and joined Third Division South club Brighton & Hove Albion in May 1926. Sykes played 16 league games in two seasons with Brighton before signing for Lincoln City in June 1928. He remained with Lincoln for three seasons, playing 44 games in all competitions, of which 42 were in the Third Division North. He finished off his playing career in non-league football with successively Peterborough & Fletton United, Luton Town and Grantham, where he played in most of the fixtures of the 1932–33 season.

Sykes died in Rotherham, South Yorkshire in 1994.

References

1900 births
1994 deaths
People from Shirebrook
Footballers from Derbyshire
English footballers
Association football midfielders
Birmingham City F.C. players
Brighton & Hove Albion F.C. players
Lincoln City F.C. players
Peterborough & Fletton United F.C. players
Luton Town F.C. players
Maltby Main F.C. players
Grantham Town F.C. players
English Football League players
Midland Football League players
Date of death missing